Hans Bänninger (17 March 1924 – 22 August 2007) was an ice hockey player for the Swiss national team. He won a silver medal at the 1948 Winter Olympics.

In 2020 he was introduced in to the IIHF All-Time Switzerland Team.

References

1924 births
2007 deaths
Ice hockey players at the 1948 Winter Olympics
Ice hockey players at the 1952 Winter Olympics
Medalists at the 1948 Winter Olympics
Olympic bronze medalists for Switzerland
Olympic ice hockey players of Switzerland
Olympic medalists in ice hockey